The 1947 season was Wisła Krakóws 39th year as a club.

Friendlies

Mixed teams

Polish Football Championship

Group stage

Final round

Squad, appearances and goals

|-
|}

Goalscorers

Disciplinary record

External links
1947 Wisła Kraków season at historiawisly.pl

Wisła Kraków seasons
Association football clubs 1947 season
Wisla